Salinas station, also known as the Salinas Intermodal Transportation Center, is an intermodal transit center in downtown Salinas, California, United States. As a transit hub, the facility is a passenger rail station and bus station.

Services
The station is a stop on the Coast Starlight from Los Angeles to Seattle, Washington.

Greyhound Lines moved its Salinas station to the property in 2015.

The Transportation Agency for Monterey County's planned Monterey County Rail Extension would see expanded Caltrain commuter rail service from the station to the San Francisco Bay Area by 2025, with long-term plans to extend Amtrak California's Capitol Corridor as well.

The station grounds were remodeled in 2021 to prepare for increased services; traffic circulation was improved by extending Lincoln Avenue to the station. Monterey–Salinas Transit local bus service will move from the Salinas Transit Center a few blocks away to the expanded station.

Design
The depot, constructed in 1941 by the Southern Pacific Railroad, exhibits a pared down Spanish Revival style as influenced by the then-popular Art Deco movement. Spanish Revival elements include the red tile roof and stuccoed walls, while the Art Deco influence is visible in the rectilinear composition and clean lines.

References

External links

Salinas Amtrak Station – USA RailGuide (TrainWeb)

Railway stations in Monterey County, California
Amtrak stations in California
Former Southern Pacific Railroad stations in California
Railway stations in the United States opened in 1872
Spanish Revival architecture in California
1872 establishments in California
Future Caltrain stations